Chris Botti in Boston is a live album by American jazz trumpeter Chris Botti. It was released on CD and DVD on March 31, 2009 through Decca Records.

The album was certified platinum in the US and diamond in Poland. It was nominated at the 2010 Grammy Awards in categories Best Pop Instrumental Album and Best Long Form Music Video, while "Emmanuel" received a nomination for Best Instrumental Arrangement.

Track listing

Charts

Certifications

References

2009 live albums
Chris Botti albums
Albums produced by Bobby Colomby
Decca Records live albums